Naïma Bouhenni-Benziane (born 23 October 1985), known as Naïma Bouhenni, is an Algerian footballer who plays as a forward for Afak Relizane and the Algeria women's national team.

Early life
Bouhenni was born in Oran.

Club career
Bouhenni played for many clubs, but essentially for AS Intissar Oran and for Afak Relizane. In 2011, she went to France and played for FC Vendenheim in France. She returned to Afak Relizane until 2012.

International career
Bouhani capped for Algeria at senior level Africa Women Cup of Nations in 2004, 2006, 2010 and 2014.
On 5 September 2022, Bouhenni announced her retirement from football.

International goals
Scores and results list Algeria's goal tally first

References

External links
Player's profile - FAF official website

1985 births
Living people
Footballers from Oran
Algerian women's footballers
Women's association football forwards
Algeria women's international footballers
Algerian expatriate footballers
Algerian expatriate sportspeople in France
Expatriate women's footballers in France
21st-century Algerian people